Moses the Hungarian (died 26 July 1043) was a Kievan Russian monk of Hungarian origin. He is venerated as a saint on 26 July by the Eastern Orthodox Church.

Moses was born around 990–995. Although the Hungarians were mostly pagan at the time (though they later became Christians), the Hungarian chieftain Gyula of Transylvania was baptized in Constantinople. This probably made it possible for Moses to leave Transylvania to serve the princely family in Kiev. Between 1015 and 1018, already preparing to become a monk, he was an escort of Predslava, the daughter of Vladimir I of Kiev and sister of the future Prince Yaroslav I the Wise.

Following the Polish expedition of 1018, he was carried to Poland as a prisoner and could only return in 1025. Moses spent the rest of his life in the Kiev Cave Monastery.

References

990s births
1043 deaths
11th-century Hungarian people
11th-century Rus' people
11th-century Christian saints
Medieval Hungarian saints
Monks of Kyiv Pechersk Lavra
Eastern Orthodox monks
Russian saints of the Eastern Orthodox Church
Eastern Orthodox Christians from Hungary
Russian people of Hungarian descent
Ukrainian people of Hungarian descent
Hungarian Christian monks